All Is Lost is a 2013 action drama film written and directed by J. C. Chandor. The film stars Robert Redford as a man lost at sea. Redford is the only cast member, and the film has 51 spoken English words. All Is Lost is Chandor's second feature film, following his 2011 debut Margin Call. It screened Out of Competition at the 2013 Cannes Film Festival.

The title of the film is a nod to E. W. Hornung's observation that when courage is lost, "all is lost".

Among many honors, the film was nominated for an Oscar for Best Sound Editing (Steve Boeddeker and Richard Hymns) and won the Golden Globe Award for Best Original Score (Alex Ebert). Redford was nominated for his own Golden Globe and won the New York Film Critics Circle Award for Best Actor.

Plot
The film begins with a flash-forward in which a man (Robert Redford) narrates a letter addressing people he will miss, as the camera pans across a lost shipping container.

In the Indian Ocean eight days earlier, the man wakes to find water flooding his boat. It has collided with a wayward shipping container, ripping a hole in the hull. The man uses a sea anchor to dislodge the container, then changes course to tilt the boat away from the hole. He patches the hole and uses a manual bilge pump to remove the water from the cabin. The boat's navigational and communications systems have been damaged by saltwater intrusion. The man tries to repair the marine radio and connects it to one of the boat's batteries. When he climbs the mast to repair an antenna lead, he sees an oncoming tropical storm.

When the storm arrives, the man runs before the wind. He intends to heave to, but as he crawls to the bow to hoist the storm jib, he is thrown overboard and only regains the deck after a desperate struggle. The boat capsizes and rights itself; during a second roll, which throws the man overboard again, the boat is dis-masted and most of the equipment is destroyed. After going below deck and being knocked out by colliding with a post, he regains consciousness to find the boat sinking, so he abandons ship in an inflatable life raft. When the storm has passed, he salvages whatever he can from his sinking boat and transfers it to the raft. Before the boat sinks, he tends to the gash on his forehead.

As the man learns to operate a sextant, he discovers he is being pulled towards a major shipping lane by ocean currents. He survives another storm but his supplies dwindle, and he learns too late that his drinking water has been contaminated with sea water. He improvises a solar still from his water container, a plastic bag, and an aluminum can, producing fresh water, and he snags a fish, but it is snapped up by a shark before he can reel it in.

The man is passed by two container ships, but he is unseen despite him using signaling flares. He drifts out of the shipping lane with no food or water. On the eighth day, he writes a letter, puts it in a jar, and throws it in the ocean as a message in a bottle. Later that night, he sees a light in the distance. He uses pages from his journal along with charts to create a signal fire. The fire grows out of control and consumes his raft. He falls into the water and allows himself to sink. Underwater, he sees the hull of a boat with a search light approaching his burning raft. He swims towards the surface to grasp an outstretched hand.

Production

Development
All Is Lost was written and directed by J. C. Chandor, his second feature film, following 2011's Margin Call. Chandor developed the idea for All Is Lost during his time commuting from Providence, Rhode Island to New York City. After meeting Robert Redford at the 2011 Sundance Film Festival, where Margin Call premiered, Chandor asked the veteran actor to be in the film. On February 9, 2012, Redford was confirmed as All Is Lost's only cast member. With only one character, the film has no dialogue, although there are a few spoken lines. The shooting script was only 31 pages long.

Filming
Principal photography began in mid-2012 at Baja Studios in Rosarito Beach in Mexico. Baja Studios was originally built for the 1997 film Titanic. Filming took place for two months in the location's water tank. In addition the crew spent "two or three days" filming in the actual ocean. Chandor would later remark that completing the film was "essentially a jigsaw puzzle" and that the crew spent less time on the actual ocean than the film would have viewers believe. At a press conference after the film's screening at Cannes 2013, Redford revealed that his ear was damaged during the production.

Music
The film score to All Is Lost is composed by Edward Sharpe and the Magnetic Zeros' frontman Alex Ebert, who signed on to the film in November 2012. Speaking of the experience of working on the film, Ebert said, "This project was a dream—an open space to play in but also space to listen to the elements—wind, water, rain, sun, are the story's other characters to me. I knew I had quite a task ahead of me: to at once allow the elements to sing and to give Redford a voice with which to, once in a while, respond." The "extra features" of the Blu-ray Disc explain the unique development of the sound track, music, script and other production considerations.

A soundtrack album featuring ten original compositions and one new song, all written, composed, and produced by Ebert, was released on October 1, 2013, by Community Music. On September 12, 2013, the song "Amen" from the soundtrack was made available for streaming.

Release
All Is Lost screened Out of Competition at the 2013 Cannes Film Festival on May 22. The film was distributed theatrically by Lionsgate and Roadside Attractions jointly in the United States. FilmNation Entertainment handled foreign sales. In February 2012, Universal Pictures purchased distribution for the UK, Australia, France, Italy, Spain, Belgium, Netherlands, South Korea, Russia and Scandinavia. Other deals were made with HGC in China, Square One Entertainment in Germany, Sun Distribution in Latin America, Paris Filmes in Brazil, Audio Visual Entertainment in Greece and Pony Canyon in Japan. It began a limited release in the United States on October 18, 2013.

Reception
Film review aggregator Rotten Tomatoes reports that 94% of critics gave the film a positive review based on 238 reviews; the average rating is 8.00/10. The site's consensus states: "Anchored by another tremendous performance in a career full of them, All Is Lost offers a moving, eminently worthwhile testament to Robert Redford's ability to hold the screen." On Metacritic the film has a score of 87 based on 45 reviews, considered to be "universal acclaim".

After the screening of the film at the Cannes Film Festival, Redford received a standing ovation. Writing for The Independent, Geoffrey Macnab says the film was "utterly compelling viewing". Andrew Pulver, writing for The Guardian, says that "Redford delivers a tour de force performance: holding the screen effortlessly with no acting support whatsoever." Justin Chang of Variety says of Redford's performance that he "holds the viewer's attention merely by wincing, scowling, troubleshooting and yelling the occasional expletive". Robbie Collin of The Telegraph says, "The film's scope is limited, but as far as it goes, All Is Lost is very good indeed: a neat idea, very nimbly executed."

In The Guardian, Peter Bradshaw raves: "Redford's near-mute performance as a mysterious old man of the sea adrift and utterly alone makes for a bold, gripping thriller." Spotting a possible metaphor, he observes: "... the entire drama works well as a parable of old age… the news of impending mortality pouring in through the windows like seawater" and concludes: "What a strikingly bold and thoughtful film." Alan Scherstuhl of The Village Voice writes that the film is "a genuine nail-biter, scrupulously made and fully involving, elemental in its simplicity." David Morgan of CBS News gives the film a positive review, stating, "Four decades ago Redford demonstrated a similar capacity for survival skills as the mountain man Jeremiah Johnson. Today, at age 77, without a supporting cast and performing virtually all of his water stunts himself, Redford proves he is still up to the task, shining in what is an extremely physical but also an intellectually demanding role."

However, the film has been criticized in the sailing world for being unrealistic, in particular for the lack of certain safety equipment deemed standard for sailboats navigating the open ocean, such as an EPIRB, and other bad decisions made by the main character. An exception to this criticism is English Yachting Monthly, in which Dick Durham claims: "Certainly the film is authentic and grippingly realistic." Director Chandor himself, who says he went sailing with his parents when young and later a few times as an adult, stated in an interview with German sailing magazine  that everything that happened in the film could have happened in reality. His only reservations were about the probability of crossing the Indian Ocean single-handed and the failure to evade the storm using modern technology and due attention.

Top ten lists
All Is Lost was listed on many critics' top ten lists.

 2nd – Robert Horton, Seattle Weekly
 3rd – Genevieve Koski, The Dissolve
 3rd – Steve Davis, Austin Chronicle
 3rd – Ty Burr, The Boston Globe
 3rd – Mark Savlov, Austin Chronicle
 4th – Lou Lumenick, New York Post
 5th – Ann Hornaday, The Washington Post
 5th – Mark Mohan, The Oregonian
 5th – Alonso Duralde, TheWrap
 5th – Brian Miller, Seattle Weekly
 6th – Stephen Schaefer, Boston Herald
 6th – Rex Reed, The New York Observer
 6th – Marjorie Baumgarten, Austin Chronicle
 6th – Mike D'Angelo, The A.V. Club
 6th – Noel Murray, The Dissolve
 6th – Barbara Vancheri, Pittsburgh Post-Gazette
 6th – Joshua Rothkopf, Time Out New York
 6th – A.O. Scott, The New York Times
 7th – David Edelstein, Vulture
 7th – Scott Feinberg, The Hollywood Reporter
 7th – Keith Phipps, The Dissolve
 7th – Sasha Stone, Awards Daily
 7th – Christopher Orr, The Atlantic
 7th – Kristopher Tapley, HitFix
 8th – Richard Roeper, Chicago Sun-Times
 9th – Lisa Schwarzbaum, BBC
 9th – Chris Nashawaty, Entertainment Weekly
 9th – Elizabeth Weitzman, New York Daily News
 Top 10 (listed alphabetically, not ranked) – David Denby, The New Yorker
 Top 10 (listed alphabetically, not ranked) – James Verniere, Boston Herald
 Top 10 (listed alphabetically, not ranked) – Claudia Puig, USA Today
 Top 10 (listed alphabetically, not ranked) – Stephen Whitty, The Star-Ledger
 Top 10 (listed alphabetically, not ranked) – Steven Rea, The Philadelphia Inquirer

Accolades

See also
 Survival film, an article about the film genre, with a list of related films
 The Old Man and the Sea

Notes

References

External links
 
 
 
 
 

2013 films
2013 action drama films
2010s action adventure films
2010s adventure drama films
2010s survival films
American action adventure films
American action drama films
American adventure drama films
American survival films
Black Bear Pictures films
Canadian action drama films
Canadian adventure drama films
FilmNation Entertainment films
Films about survivors of seafaring accidents or incidents
Films directed by J. C. Chandor
Films set in the Indian Ocean
Films shot in Mexico
Films without speech
Lionsgate films
One-character films
Sailing films
Sea adventure films
Seafaring films
Roadside Attractions films
Universal Pictures films
2010s American films
2010s Canadian films